Kim Tae-Hoon (Hangul: 김태훈, born October 9, 1988 in Daegu) is a South Korean short track speed skater.

At the 2011 Winter Universiade, Kim won the gold medal in the men's 1000 metre events. He added silver in the 1500 metres.

References

1988 births
Living people
South Korean male short track speed skaters
Universiade medalists in short track speed skating
Sportspeople from Daegu
Universiade gold medalists for South Korea
Universiade silver medalists for South Korea
Competitors at the 2011 Winter Universiade
21st-century South Korean people